George "Butch" Estes (born June 14, 1949) is a men's basketball coach.  He previously served as the head coach at Presbyterian College and Furman University. Estes resigned from Furman in March 1994, after finishing the 1993–94 season with a 9–17 record.

Coach Estes was the Head at Palm Beach State College from 2010 to 2013. He was offered the head coaching job at Barry University in 2013 and accepted it.

References

1949 births
Living people
American men's basketball coaches
Barry Buccaneers men's basketball coaches
College men's basketball head coaches in the United States
East Carolina Pirates men's basketball coaches
Furman Paladins men's basketball coaches
Guilford Quakers men's basketball coaches
Junior college men's basketball coaches in the United States
Miami Hurricanes men's basketball coaches
Presbyterian Blue Hose men's basketball coaches
Rice Owls men's basketball coaches
The Citadel Bulldogs basketball coaches
University of North Carolina at Chapel Hill alumni
Seattle Redhawks men's basketball coaches